Mirdadzai or Meerdadzai is a Pashtun tribe that is located the Killa Saifullah , Pishin and Loralai districts of Pakistan.  

The Mirdadzai are related to the Kakar Khudiadadzai. The warrior Saifullah Khan belonged to the Mirdadazai tribe.  

Ethnic groups in Afghanistan
Gharghashti Pashtun tribes
Pashto-language surnames
Pakistani names